Jovanka is the diminutive form of the Slavic female name Jovana. 

It may refer to:
 Jovanka Broz, the former First Lady of Yugoslavia, wife of Josip Broz Tito
 Jovanka Houska, English chess player
 Tegan Jovanka, a fictional character in the television series Doctor Who
 Jovanka (Slavic folklore), a named vila (nymph) in Slavic mythology